MacNutt is a surname. Notable people with the surname include:

 Derrick Somerset Macnutt (1902–1971) was a British crossword compiler
 Francis MacNutt (1925–2020) is a former American Roman Catholic priest
 Frederick MacNutt (1873–1949) was an eminent Anglican priest and author from the United Kingdom
 George Taylor MacNutt (19 December 1865 – 24 May 1937) was a Conservative member of the Canadian House of Commons
 Peter MacNutt (April 5, 1834 – ) was a merchant and political figure in Prince Edward Island, Canada
 Thomas MacNutt (August 3, 1850 – February 5, 1927) was a Canadian politician
 Thomas Russell MacNutt (September 28, 1895 – February 21, 1973) was a merchant and political figure in Saskatchewan
 Walter MacNutt (2 June 1910 – 10 August 1996) was a Canadian organist, choir director, and composer

See also
 MacNutt, a town in Saskatchewan named for Thomas MacNutt (1850 – 1927)